The Roman Catholic Diocese of Palmira is a diocese located in the city of Palmira in the Ecclesiastical province of Cali in Colombia.

History
 17 December 1952: Established as Diocese of Palmira from the Diocese of Cali and Archdiocese of Popayán

Bishops

Ordinaries
Jesús Antonio Castro Becerra (1952.12.18 – 1983.08.20)
José Mario Escobar Serna (1983.08.20 – 2000.10.13)
Orlando Antonio Corrales García (2001.04.09 – 2007.01.12) Appointed, Archbishop of Santa Fe de Antioquia
Abraham Escudero Montoya(2007.02.02 – 2009.11.06)
Edgar de Jesús García Gil (2010.03.24 – present)

Coadjutor bishop
José Mario Escobar Serna (1982-1983)

See also
Roman Catholicism in Colombia

Sources

External links
 Catholic Hierarchy
 GCatholic.org

Roman Catholic dioceses in Colombia
Roman Catholic Ecclesiastical Province of Cali
Christian organizations established in 1952
Roman Catholic dioceses and prelatures established in the 20th century
1952 establishments in Colombia